Ahnberg may refer to:

 Ahnberg, South Dakota
 Henrik Ahnberg or AdmiralBulldog (born 1990), Swedish Dota 2 player
 Annika Åhnberg, Member of the Riksdag